Koliada, Koleda or Kolyada or  Kolęda can refer to:

 Koliada, a pre-Christian Slavic winter ritual 
 Koliada (deity), in Slavic mythology, a pagan god, impersonating the newborn Sun.
 Kolęda, Lower Silesian Voivodeship, a village in Poland.
 Kolyada (surname)
 Koleda, the Bulgarian word for Christmas.
 Kalėdos, the Lithuanian word for Christmas.

See also